Sranan Tongo (also Sranantongo "Surinamese tongue," Sranan, Surinaams, Surinamese, Surinamese Creole) is an English-based creole language that is spoken as a lingua franca by approximately 550,000 people in Suriname.

Developed originally among slaves from West Africa and English colonists, its use as a lingua franca expanded after the Dutch took over the colony in 1667, and 85% of the vocabulary comes from English and Dutch. It also became the common language among the indigenous peoples and the indentured laborers imported by the Dutch; these groups included speakers of Javanese, Sarnami Hindustani, Saramaccan, and varieties of Chinese.

Origins 

The Portuguese were the first European explorers of the West African coast. A trading pidgin language developed between them and Africans, and later explorers, including the English, also used this creole.

Based on its lexicon, Sranan Tongo has been found to have developed originally as an English-based creole language, because of the early influence of English colonists here in what was then part of English colony of Guiana, who imported numerous Africans as slaves for the plantations. After the Dutch takeover in 1667 (in exchange for ceding the North American eastern seaboard colony of New Netherland to the English), a substantial overlay of words were adopted from the Dutch language.

Sranan Tongo's lexicon is a fusion of mostly English grammar
and Dutch vocabulary (85%), plus some vocabulary from Spanish, Portuguese and West African languages. It began as a pidgin spoken primarily by enslaved Africans from various tribes in Suriname, who often did not have an African language in common. Sranan Tongo also became the language of communication between the slaves. So the slave owners could not understand the slaves, the slaves would often make escaping plans in Sranan Tongo. Under Dutch rule, the slaves were not permitted to learn or speak Dutch. As other ethnic groups, such as East Indians and Chinese, were brought to Suriname as indentured workers, Sranan Tongo became a lingua franca.

Phonology and orthography 
 

Until the middle of the 20th century, most written texts in Sranan, seen at the time as a low-prestige language, used a spelling that was not standardized but based on Dutch orthography, recording an approximation of how Sranan words sound to Dutch ears. In view of the considerable differences between the phonologies of Sranan and Dutch, this was not a satisfactory situation.

With the emergence of a movement striving for the emancipation of Sranan as a respectable language, the need for a phonology-based orthography was felt. A more suitable orthography developed as an informal consensus from the publications of linguists studying Sranan and related creoles. For every-day use, the Dutch-based spelling remained common, while some literary authors adopted (variants of) the linguistic spelling.

To end this situation, the Surinamese government commissioned a committee of linguists and writers to define a standard spelling, which was adopted and came into force in 1986. This standard basically followed the linguistic consensus. However, as the language is not taught in schools, while Dutch is, many speakers are not clearly aware of the principles on which this spelling is based and keep using a Dutchish, variant spelling.

Modern use 

Although the formal Dutch-based educational system repressed the use of Sranan Tongo, in the past pejoratively dismissed as Taki Taki (literally meaning "talk talk" or "say say"), it gradually became more accepted by the establishment and wider society to speak it. During the 1980s, this language was popularized by publicly known speakers, including president Dési Bouterse, who often delivered national speeches in Sranan Tongo.

Sranan Tongo remains widely used in Suriname and in Dutch urban areas populated by immigrants from Suriname. They especially use it in casual conversation, often freely mixing it with Dutch. Written code-switching between Sranan Tongo and Dutch is also common in computer-mediated communication.
People often greet each other in Sranan Tongo by saying, for example,  (how are you), instead of the more formal Dutch  (how is it going).

In 2021, Sranan Tongo appeared for the first time in the Eurovision Song Contest in Jeangu Macrooy's song, "Birth of a New Age".

Literature 

As a written language, Sranan Tongo has existed since the late 18th century. The first publication in Sranan Tongo was in 1783 by Hendrik Schouten who wrote a part Dutch, part Sranan Tongo poem, called Een huishoudelijke twist (A Domestic Tiff). The first important book was published in 1864 by Johannes King, and relates to his travels to Drietabbetje for the Moravian Church.

Early writers often used their own spelling system. An official orthography was adopted by the government of Suriname on July 15, 1986, in Resolution 4501. A few writers have used Sranan in their work, most notably the poet Henri Frans de Ziel ("Trefossa"), who also wrote God zij met ons Suriname, Suriname's national anthem, whose second verse is sung in Sranan Tongo.

Other notable writers in Sranan Tongo are Eugène Drenthe, André Pakosie, Celestine Raalte, Michaël Slory, and Bea Vianen.

See also 
 Dutch-based creole languages
 English-based creole languages
 Guyanese Creole

References

Sources 

 Iwan Desiré Menke: Een grammatica van het Surinaams (Sranantongo), Munstergeleen : Menke, 1986, 1992 (Dutch book on grammar of Sranan Tongo)
 Jan Voorhoeve and Ursy M. Lichtveld: Creole Drum. An Anthology of Creole Literature in Suriname. New Haven: Yale University Press, 1975.
 C.F.A. Bruijning and J. Voorhoeve (editors): Encyclopedie van Suriname. Amsterdam: Uitgeverij Elsevier, 1977, pp. 573–574.
 Eithne B. Carlin and Jacques Arends (editors): Atlas of the Languages of Suriname. Leiden: KITLV Press, 2002.
 Michaël Ietswaart and Vinije Haabo: Sranantongo. Surinaams voor reizigers en thuisblijvers. Amsterdam: Mets & Schilt (several editions since 1999)
 J.C.M. Blanker and J. Dubbeldam: "Prisma Woordenboek Sranantongo". Utrecht: Uitgeverij Het Spectrum B.V., 2005, www.prismawoordenboeken.nl - A Sranantongo to Dutch and Dutch to Sranantongo dictionary.
 Henri J.M. Stephen: Sranan odo : adyersitori - spreekwoorden en gezegden uit Suriname. Amsterdam, Stephen, 2003,  (collection of proverbs and expressions)
 Michiel van Kempen and Gerard Sonnemans: Een geschiedenis van de Surinaamse literatuur. Breda : De Geus, 2003,  (Dutch history of Surinam literature)

External links 

 Dictionaries
 SIL International “Sranan wortubuku, Sranan-Nederlands interaktief woordenboek” (Sranan-Dutch interactive dictionary)
 Sranan Tongo Swadesh list of basic vocabulary words (from Wiktionary's Swadesh list appendix)
 Webster's Sranan-English Online Dictionary
 SIL International “Sranan Tongo – English Dictionary” (PDF format)
 Grammar
 Conjugate Sranantongo verbs (Verbix)
 Resources and more
 "Sranan Tongo Interactive Library": Sranan texts with a bilingual interactive dictionary
 How Transparent is Creole Morphology? A Study of Early Sranan Word Formation (30 p., Braun & Plag, 2002) (PDF format)
 Syntactic Developments in Sranan (408 p., Arends, 1989) (PDF format)
 Begin to learn
 Words of Life: Sranang Tongo talk (audio) (YouTube)
 “Mama Sranan” - Mother Suriname, a song in Sranantongo (with subtitled translation) by Steven Akkrum & Da Originals (YouTube)
 The New Testament in Sranan for iTunes

 
Dutch-based pidgins and creoles
English-based pidgins and creoles
English language in the Americas
Dutch language in the Americas
Languages of Suriname
Creoles of the Americas